El Grito sagrado is a 1954 Argentine film.

Cast

External links
 

1954 films
1950s Spanish-language films
Argentine black-and-white films
Films directed by Luis César Amadori
Argentine historical drama films
1950s historical drama films
1950s Argentine films